Lee Willie Johnson (born 16 June 1957) is an American former professional basketball player. He played briefly in the National Basketball Association (NBA) and several other leagues.

College career
Johnson played college basketball for four years at East Texas State University, before being drafted by the Houston Rockets in the 1979 NBA draft.

Professional career
Johnson played only one season in the NBA, with the Rockets and Detroit Pistons. Throughout his career, Johnson played with the Rochester Zeniths of the Continental Basketball Association, in Italy, Israel, and France, most notably for Arrigoni Rieti, with whom he won the 1979–80 season of Korać Cup, and with Maccabi Tel Aviv, from 1984 through 1987.

Awards
1980–81 CBA Rookie of the Year
1980–81 CBA Playoffs MVP

External links

Profile —TheDraftReview.com

1957 births
Living people
20th-century African-American sportspeople
21st-century African-American people
African-American basketball players
American expatriate basketball people in France
American expatriate basketball people in Israel
American expatriate basketball people in Italy
American men's basketball players
Basket Napoli players
Basketball players from Arkansas
Centers (basketball)
Detroit Pistons players
Houston Rockets draft picks
Houston Rockets players
Junior college men's basketball players in the United States
Lega Basket Serie A players
Libertas Liburnia Basket Livorno players
Maccabi Tel Aviv B.C. players
Montana Grizzlies basketball players
Olympique Antibes basketball players
Paris Racing Basket players
People from Conway County, Arkansas
Power forwards (basketball)
Rochester Zeniths players
Texas A&M–Commerce Lions men's basketball players